Pailin Chuchottaworn (born 1956) is a Thai businessman, and from 2011 to 2015 was the chief executive officer (CEO) of PTT Public Company Limited, a Thai state-owned oil and gas company, and a Fortune Global 500 company.

Education
Chuchottaworn was born in 1956. He has a bachelor's degree from Chulalongkorn University, a master's degree from the Tokyo Institute of Technology, and a doctorate in from Tokyo Institute of Technology, all in chemical engineering.

Career
Chuchottaworn was the CEO and president of PTT from September 2011 to September 2015. He is the founder and chairman of Kamnoetvidya Science Academy, Rayong, Thailand, which is run by PTT.

Pailin was appointed Deputy Transport Minister in December 2017 until 2019.

References

1956 births
Living people
Pailin Chuchottaworn
Pailin Chuchottaworn
Pailin Chuchottaworn